Kostas Tsanas (born 22 August 1967) is a Greek former professional footballer who played as a midfielder. He is the current technical director of the Hellenic Football Federation.

Career
He began his career playing for Levadiakos (1985–1995) and was later transferred to Kalamata FC. He then played for Athinaikos (1996–1999) and finished off that portion of his career with Ethnikos Piraeus FC. In the 1992–93 season, he was the top Greek Second Division scorer with 14 goals. In total he played 257 games in A Division and 75 in Second Division, scoring 30 and 25 goals respectively.

In 2001, he began his coaching career in the academies of Athinaikos. His first head coaching experience was in 2005 with Athinaikos and in 2006 took charge of Ilisiakos. In 2008-2009 he worked as a scouter for AEK FC.

He went on to join the National team staff as an assistant coach for the U19 and U21. In October 2011 he took charge of the Greece national under-19 football team and led them to the finals of the 2012 UEFA European Under-19 Football Championship.

In August 2012 he was named the head coach of the Greece national under-21 football team. 
. 

He has been a caretaker coach of the Greece national football team on two occasions. From 2019 to 2021 he was an academy director in AEK Athens football club. In August 2021, Tsanas was appointed as a technical director from the Hellenic Football Federation.

International
Greece U19
UEFA European Under-19 Championship runner-up:2012

References

External links

1967 births
Living people
Greek footballers
Greek football managers
Athinaikos F.C. managers
Ilisiakos F.C. managers
Greece national football team managers
Association football midfielders
AEK F.C. non-playing staff
People from Boeotia
Footballers from Central Greece